Endsley may refer to:

Jane Johnson Endsley (1848–1933), Texas businesswoman and community leader
Melvin Endsley (1934–2004), American musician
Mica Endsley, American Chief Scientist of the United States Air Force, pioneer in levels of autonomy of computer-controlled systems, and situational awareness.
Mike Endsley (born 1962), American politician
Shane Endsley, American musician

See also
Endsleigh (disambiguation)